Linus Weber (born 1 November 1999) is a German professional volleyball player. He is a member of the Germany national team, and a silver medallist at the 2017 European Championship. At the professional club level, he plays for Projekt Warsaw.

Honours

Clubs
 National championships
 2018/2019  German Championship, with Berlin Recycling Volleys

References

External links

 
 Player profile at LegaVolley.it 
 Player profile at PlusLiga.pl   
 Player profile at Volleybox.net

1999 births
Living people
Sportspeople from Gera
German men's volleyball players
German expatriate sportspeople in Italy
Expatriate volleyball players in Italy
German expatriate sportspeople in Poland
Expatriate volleyball players in Poland
Projekt Warsaw players
Opposite hitters
Expatriate volleyball players in Qatar
German expatriate sportspeople in Qatar